Wellington On a Plate is an annual food festival run by the Wellington Culinary Events Trust (WCET) a non-profit charitable trust which was created to support Wellington's hospitality industry during the winter low-season. The first Wellington On a Plate festival was held in August 2009. Visa has been a naming rights sponsor of the festival since 2010, and the festival is known as 'Visa Wellington On a Plate'.

The festival consists of various events and special festival-only dishes, cocktails and burgers.  The festival showcases local chefs and producers  attracting visitors from New Zealand and around the world. Economic studies have shown the festival contributes $30m NZD to Wellington's local economy each year. 

Wellington On a Plate is one of the largest food festivals in the Southern hemisphere based on consumer participation across all platforms . Typically more than 250 hospitality venues take part in Wellington On a Plate each year.  There is a different theme each year which sets the tone for the festival. 

Traditionally Wellington On a Plate has been held in August, however from 2023 the festival will split into two editions every year in May and August.  

The May edition of Visa Wellington On a Plate from 5–21 May presents festival events, Dine Wellington and Cocktail Wellington. Dine Wellington challenges local chefs to create a dish that showcases local produce and serves 'Wellington On a Plate' that relates to the festival theme.  Cocktail Wellington challenges local bartenders to create a cocktail that also embodies the festival theme for the year. 

The August edition from 11 to 27 August includes Burger Wellington and Beervana, a craft-beer festival that attracts around 16,000 people each year. Local craft brewery Garage Project has been a sponsor of Burger Wellington since 2013. 

The best of the festival are recognised at awards for Dine and Cocktail in May and Burger Wellington in August.

History 
The festival began in 2009 with 35 participants.  In 2022 there were more than 250 venues participating from across the Wellington region.  Since 2009 there have been more than 87,500 Festival events tickets sold and 1500 festival events held across Wellington. 

The Burger Wellington challenge first started in 2010. From 2013 Wellington Craft Beer Brewery Garage Project became a major partner of Burger Wellington, with the name changing to Garage Project presents Burger Wellington.  

International chef and food personality collaborations over the years include: Alla Wolf Tasker, Melbourne, Australia; Analiese Gregory, Hobart, Tasmania; Anna Hansen, London, UK; Ash Heeger, Birmingham, United Kingdom; Ben Shewry, Melbourne, Australia; Bob Piechznick, Melbourne, Australia; Chef Wan, Kuala Lumpur, Malaysia; Cheong Liew, Adelaide, Australia; Dan Hong, Sydney, Australia; Dean Brettschneider, Singapore; Frank Camorra, Melbourne, Australia; James Knappett, London, UK; Karen Martini, Melbourne, Australia; Keigo Tamura, Kyoto, Japan; Kenny Trinh, Adelaide, Australia; Kim Wejendorp, Copenhagen, Denmark; Maggie Beer, Adelaide, Australia; Margot Henderson, London, UK; Mark Best, Sydney, Australia; May Chow, Hong Kong; Morgan McGlone, Sydney, Australia; Nancy Silverton, Los Angeles, USA; Nyesha Arrington, Los Angeles, USA; Ravinder Bhogal, London, UK; Ron Finley, Los Angeles, USA; Sara Kramer, Los Angeles, USA 

Chef collaborations from across New Zealand include: Al Brown, Auckland;  Casey McDonald, Hawke's Bay; Desmond Harris, Auckland;  Graham Brown, Christchurch;  Jason Kim, Auckland; Johnny Schwass, Christchurch; Josh Emett, Auckland; Julie Le Clerc, Auckland; Michael Meredith, Auckland;  Lauraine Jacobs, Auckland;  Nadia Lim, Queenstown;  Peter Gordon, Auckland;  Ruth Pretty, Kāpiti; Vaughan Mabee, Queenstown; Jack Cashmore, Central North Island; Giulia Sturla, Christchurch; Carlo Buenaventura, Auckland; Otis Shapiro, Auckland; Kasey and Kārena Bird, Maketu.

The 2022 festival 
The theme for 2022 was 'State of Flux'. That year more 12,000 foodies rated 70 different Dine Wellington dishes, explored 80 different drinks as part of Cocktail Wellington, and visited 200 hospitality venues participating in Burger Wellington during the Wellington On a Plate festival.  Typically 250,000 burgers are sold through the festival each year. 

Two new awards were introduced to the festival in 2022:
 The Next Gen Cook Off at Everybody Eats which saw five young chefs compete weekly and cook meals for the charity organisation with a restaurant located in Wellington’s CBD.  The initiative raised more than $18,000.
 The Lumina Lamb Rising Stars Awards recognise emerging hospitality talent, and nominations are put forward from Wellington’s venues.

Recognition 
 Metro Magazine 2022 Best Of Wellington – Best Event
 Felix Awards 2020 – Outstanding Innovation of the Year for At Yours by Visa Wellington On a Plate
 LGNZ EXCELLENCE Awards 2019 – Creative New Zealand EXCELLENCE Award for Cultural Well-being (with Wellington City Council)
 NZEA Event Awards 2019 – Best Sponsorship 2018
 Wellington Gold Awards 2018 – Vibrant Gold
 New Zealand Association of Event Professionals Awards 2014 – Best Partnership for an Event and Best Established Regional Event

References 

 </ref>

External links 
 
 Wellington Culinary Events Trust
 www.beervana.co.nz

Food and drink festivals in New Zealand
Festivals in Wellington